The German Communist Party is a communist party in Germany. The DKP supports left positions and was an observer member of the European Left. At the end of February 2016 it left the European party.

History
The DKP considered itself a reconstitution of the Communist Party of Germany (KPD), which had been banned by the Federal Constitutional Court in 1956 for its aggressively militant opposition to the West German constitution. The new party was formed on September 25, 1968 

The foundation was preceded by talks between former KPD functionaries and Gustav Heinemann, the West German minister of justice, who explained to them that while a refounding of a banned party was not legally possible, Communists were free to form an entirely new party. Even though the close links to the banned KPD made the new party liable to be declared illegal, no such declaration was requested by the German government as West German authorities were liberalizing the attitude towards the communist bloc and East Germany in particular.

The DKP remained on the political fringe, never winning more than 0.3% of the total votes in federal elections. It had relatively greater local support in the 1970s: it achieved up to 2.2% of the vote in Hamburg, 3.1% in Bremen and 2.7% in the Saarland. Following German reunification, the DKP entered a steady decline.

The DKP received national public attention in early 2008 when Christel Wegner, elected to the state parliament of Lower Saxony on the list of the Left Party as the first DKP member of a state parliament, allegedly endorsed the Berlin Wall, the Stasi and other aspects of the East German state in an interview. This caused embarrassment to the national Left Party leadership. Despite denying that she made the controversial statements (at least in the form that was reported) she was expelled from the Left Party faction a few days later.

The DKP ended its observer status in the Party of the European Left on 27 February 2016.

Media
The party publishes a weekly newspaper, Unsere Zeit.

Election results

Bundestag

European Parliament

See also
Communist Party of Germany (1918)
Communist Party of Germany (1990)

Footnotes

External links

30 Year history, a speech
Documents of the foundation
Unsere Zeit (UZ) Socialist Weekly Newspaper
50,000 People Attend German Communist Party Media Fair People's Weekly World, 22 June 2009

1968 establishments in West Germany
Communist parties in Germany
East Germany–West Germany relations
Far-left politics in Germany
Außerparlamentarische Opposition
Party of the European Left former member parties
Political parties established in 1968
International Meeting of Communist and Workers Parties